The electromeric effect is a molecular polarizability occurring by an intramolecular electron
displacement characterized by the substitution of one electron pair for another within the same atomic octet of electrons. It is sometimes called the conjugative mechanism, and previously, the tautomeric mechanism). The electromeric effect is often considered along with inductive effect as types of electron displacement. Although some people refer it as an effect produced by the presence of a reagent like an electrophile or a nucleophile, IUPAC does not define it as such. The term electromeric effect is no longer used in standard texts and is considered as obsolete. The concepts implied by the terms electromeric effect and mesomeric effect are absorbed in the term resonance effect. This effect can be represented using curved arrows which symbolize the electron shift, as in the diagram below:

Types of electromeric effects 
The electric effect can be classified into two types, namely the +E effect and the -E effect. This classification is based on the direction of electron pair transfer. When the attacking reagent is electrophile, the +E effect is generally observed and π-electrons are transferred to the positively charged atom. When the attacking reagent is a nucleophile, there is generally an -E effect, where π electrons are transferred to atoms to which the attacking reagent will not bind.

References

Physical organic chemistry
Chemical bonding